Giuseppe D'Urso (born 15 September 1969) is a former Italian 800 metres runner, vice-world champion in 1993.

Biography
Giuseppe D'Urso won four medals, at senior level, at the International athletics competitions. He participated at one edition of the Summer Olympics (1996), he has 31 caps in national team from 1989 to 2000. He won a silver medal at the 1993 World Championships in Stuttgart. In addition he won a silver medal at the 1996 European Indoor Championships. His personal best in 800 metres is 1'43"95.

Achievements

National titles
He has won 7 times the individual national championship.
2 wins in the 800 metres (1993, 1994)
3 wins in the 800 metres indoor (1993, 1996, 2000)
2 wins in the 1500 metres indoor (1997, 1998)

See also
 Italian all-time lists - 800 metres
 Italian all-time lists - 1500 metres
 Italy at the 1990 European Athletics Championships

References

External links
 

1969 births
Living people
Athletes (track and field) at the 1996 Summer Olympics
Italian male middle-distance runners
Olympic athletes of Italy
Sportspeople from Catania
World Athletics Championships medalists
Universiade medalists in athletics (track and field)
World Athletics Championships athletes for Italy
Mediterranean Games gold medalists for Italy
Mediterranean Games medalists in athletics
Athletes (track and field) at the 1997 Mediterranean Games
Universiade gold medalists for Italy
Medalists at the 1991 Summer Universiade
Athletics competitors of Fiamme Azzurre